Desmond "Desi" Curry (born 19 September 1960) is a Northern Irish football manager,Who is now the GM of Glentoran FC. Formally the caretaker manager of the Gibraltar national football team between January and June 2018. He has served as Technical Director for the Gibraltar Football Association since 2016. Since 2020 he has been in charge of the Gibraltar national under-19 football team while also coaching the under-17s.

Career
Curry played football at schoolboy level, representing Stranmillis University College's side while studying. After graduating, he became the head of Physical Education at Laurehill Community College before working part-time at Irish Football Association.

In 2009, Curry, who was previously a manager for a number of years for Northern Ireland under 16, was named IFA's Technical Director. He was also manager of the under-15 side in 2013, but left his post in August of that year. He then joined FIFA and UEFA as a consultant.

On 10 January 2017, Curry was announced as Technical Director of Gibraltar Football Association. On 20 February 2018, he was appointed interim manager of the national team after Jeff Wood left the post. His first game in charge occurred on 25 March, against Latvia; a goal from Liam Walker granted a 1–0 win for the hosts, which was the nation's first ever official triumph at home.

At the start of the 2022/23 season he was appointed the new General Manager of Glentoran FC.

References

External links
Football.info profile

1960 births
Living people
Football managers from Northern Ireland
Gibraltar national football team managers
Expatriate football managers from Northern Ireland
Alumni of Stranmillis University College
Schoolteachers from Northern Ireland
Association footballers from Northern Ireland
Association footballers not categorized by position
Association football coaches